Vojtěch Preissig (31 July 1873 – 11 June 1944) was a Czech typographer, printmaker, designer, illustrator, painter and teacher. He studied in Prague at the School of Applied Industrial Art (in Friedrich Ohmann's Decorative Architecture workshop) from 1892 to 1896 and at the School of Decorative Architecture from 1897 to 1898.

Life

 

Vojtěch Preissig was born on 31 July 1873 in Světec, northern Bohemia. His father was a mining engineer. In 1884 he moved to Prague where he studied at the School of Applied Industrial Art from 1892 to 1896, then at the School of Decorative Architecture from 1897 to 1898. In 1897 he moved to Paris and worked for two years with the Czech Art Nouveau artist, Alphonse Mucha. His early, Secessionist, work was influenced by Japanese art and Symbolism. He returned to Prague in 1903 where he founded the periodical Česká grafika ("Czech Graphics"), published the book Barevný lept a barevná rytina ("Color Etchings and Color Engravings") in 1909 and opened his own graphics studio in 1905. Unfortunately, the graphics studio was not a financial success so he moved to the United States in 1910 and worked as an art instructor. Preissig remained in the United States until 1930. He taught at Columbia University and the Art Students League of New York starting in 1912, then moved to Boston by 1916 and taught a course in graphic arts for the Wentworth Institute. He became the director of the School of Printing and Graphic Arts, until 1926. During his time with the Wentworth Institute he designed recruitment posters for the United States armed forces of World War I, which were principally aimed at Czech immigrants.

Membership in Czech resistance

Preissig, along with his daughter Irena Bernášková, supported the Czech resistance during both World Wars and was arrested in 1940 for doing graphic design work for one of the most important magazines of the resistance, called V boj ("Into the Fight"), that had been outlawed by German authorities. He died on 11 June 1944 in Dachau concentration camp.

Work
During World War I he designed recruitment posters for the United States armed forces, which were mainly directed at Czech immigrants. Preissig's work with book design and font design originated from a need for better printing type in Czech. Czech printers had traditionally used German typefaces and added additional diacritical marks as needed.

Preissig Antiqua
Preissig's work with typefaces began by creating the Preissig Antiqua typeface. Preissig created 'Preissig Antiqua' roughly around the early 20th Century that would influence the style of print and type designs not only in Czechoslovakia, but also all over Europe in general.

Tributes and awards
The Czech government has commemorated Vojtěch Preissig by issuing stamps that feature his work in 1988, 1994 and 1998.
In 1992, after Preissig's death, he was awarded the Order of Tomáš Garrigue Masaryk, class II.
In 2008 the United States embassy in Prague held an exhibit of Preissig's work.

References

External links

 Postcards and Stamps by Vojtěch Preissig.
 Digitization of Preissig Antiqua, Preissig Antikva Pro.

Czech painters
Czech male painters
1873 births
1944 deaths
Recipients of the Order of Tomáš Garrigue Masaryk
Czech typographers and type designers
Czech illustrators
Art Nouveau illustrators
Art Nouveau painters
People from Teplice District
Czech resistance members
Czech people who died in Nazi concentration camps
Resistance members who died in Nazi concentration camps
Czechoslovak civilians killed in World War II
Austro-Hungarian artists